93 Field Regiment is part of the Regiment of Artillery of the Indian Army.

History
Raised in Haldwani in 1963 by Lieutenant Colonel Laiq Ram, the regiment was re-organised as a field regiment at Allahabad in 1975.

Composition
It presently consists of troops from South India. The war cry of the regiment is Velluvom Velluvom Vetrikonde Selluvom, which translates to We will win and we will continue to win. The regimental song is Surangani.

Equipment
It was equipped with the 105 mm Light Field Gun Mk-II  and has recently been inducted with the 155 mm / 45 Calibre Dhanush howitzer, becoming one of the first units to be armed with this gun.

Operations
Indo-Pakistani War of 1965
The regiment was part of Operation Ablaze, Operation Riddle and Operation Grand Slam in the Sialkot sector. The regiment less one battery was part of the 69 Mountain Brigade located at Mahrajke, east of Sialkot and was equipped with 3.7 howitzer guns of World War I vintage and 120 mm mortars.
Indo-Pakistani War of 1971
The regiment was located at Agartala before the war and was equipped with 75/24 mm guns . It was asked to move to Sylhet sector, where it provided artillery support. It subsequently took part in the surrender of Pakistani forces after the declaration of ceasefire on 16 December 1971. 
Operation Pawan
The regiment moved from Secunderabad to Sri Lanka in October 1987 to join the Indian Peace Keeping Force. It was part of the 54 Infantry Division. The regiment lost one officer and the regimental medical officer, the latter to sniper fire during the operations in the outskirts of Jaffna.
Kargil War
The regiment was one of the first to reach Tiger Hill during Operation Vijay and provided artillery support to help the re-conquest of this important location.

Counter terrorist operations
During its counter insurgency and internal security tenures, the regiment took part in Operation Rakshak, Operation Vyavastha, Operation Rakshak II (1994-1997), Operation Rhino and Operation Fort William.
Other operations
The regiment has also participated in Operation Trident and Operation Falcon.

Achievements
The regiment won the  Chief of the Army Staff Unit Citation and General Officer Commanding-in-Chief (Northern Command)’s ‘unit appreciation’ award in 1998 for counter terrorist operations in Jammu and Kashmir. The regiment has won 6 Sena Medals, 2 Mentioned in dispatches, 10 Chief of the Army Staff's Commendation Cards and 9 General Officer Commanding in Chief's Commendation Cards.

The regiment had the honour to participate in the 71st Republic Day Parade and Army Day parade in 2020 with its new Equipment 155mm Dhanush Howitzer.

See also
List of artillery regiments of Indian Army

References

Military units and formations established in 1963
Artillery regiments of the Indian Army after 1947
Units of the Indian Peace Keeping Force